Andrews Osborne Academy (AOA) is a private, coeducational boarding and day school for Grades Pre-K -12 located on  of land in Willoughby, Ohio,  east of Cleveland. The student body is 73% day students and 27% boarding students, 51% male and 49% female, representing 4 states and 20 countries.

Academics 

118 academic courses and 12 AP classes are offered, with electives that include International Human Rights, Robotics, Game Design and 3D Modeling, Biotechnology, Video and Animation, Electricity, Magnetism and Optics and Portfolio Development.

Campus 

Located on 300 acres within walking distance of downtown Willoughby, Ohio, the campus of Andrews Osborne Academy features classroom buildings for the Lower School (PK - Grade 5), Middle School (Grade 6 - Grade 8) and Upper School (Grade 9 - Grade 12), as well as a 658 seat auditorium, 9 computer and science labs, student union, art gallery, 7 dormitories, observatory, and athletic facilities.

Athletics 
AOA is a member of the Independent School League (ISL) for middle school and Lake Effect Conference (LEC) for upper school athletics, and competes as a member of the Ohio High School Athletic Association (OHSAA).

Athletic Facilities 
Close to academic buildings and dormitories are 5 tennis courts, 2 gymnasiums, weight and cardio rooms, outdoor fields for baseball, softball, soccer and lacrosse, a 3.1 mile cross country trail and the Indoor Athletic Center.

Opened in 2015, the Indoor Athletic Center includes a 200 x 100 foot synthetic turf playing surface used for a variety of indoor sports including soccer, baseball and lacrosse. Batting cages and a pitching area are also featured. The complex is used by the AOA community for the training and conditioning of various athletic teams as well as physical education classes.  In November 2017, a second synthetic turf playing surface was added to the facility.    Athletic facilities are also leveraged by partners Golden Spikes Baseball Organization and Croatia Juniors Cleveland Soccer Club.

Athletic Events 

 AOA Invitational, annual cross country invitational 
 Melanie Williams Memorial Tournament, annual basketball tournament

Partnerships 
AOA partners with organizations to provide academic and residential components to students training in athletics and the arts.

 The Cleveland Ballet, Pre-professional Ballet
 Fine Arts Association
 The International Sports Academy at Andrews Osborne, Basketball
 Maypine-Flagship Farm, Equestrian

History 
In the Fall of 2007, The Andrews School in Willoughby, Ohio and Phillips-Osborne School in Painesville, Ohio merged to form Andrews Osborne Academy on the 300 acre campus of The Andrews School.

The Andrews School 
Founded in 1910 by Wallace Corydon Andrews and his wife, Margaret St. John Andrews, as The Andrews Institute for Girls.  A number of majors were available such as Business, Foods, Retail, Cosmetology, and Clothing. In the early 1980s, The Andrews School became a college preparatory school, and at the time of the merger in 2007, served girls in grades 7-12.

The Phillips-Osborne School 
Founded in 1972 as The Phillips School in Painesville, Ohio and renamed Phillips-Osborne School in 1992.   At the time of the merger in 2007, it was a co-ed school for PK - Grade 8.

References



Private high schools in Ohio
Private middle schools in Ohio
Private elementary schools in Ohio
Boarding schools in Ohio
1910 establishments in Ohio
Educational institutions established in 1910